Mohamed Ahmed Osman (born 10 July 1920) was an Egyptian wrestler. He competed at the 1948 Summer Olympics and the 1952 Summer Olympics.

References

External links
  

1920 births
Possibly living people
Egyptian male sport wrestlers
Olympic wrestlers of Egypt
Wrestlers at the 1948 Summer Olympics
Wrestlers at the 1952 Summer Olympics
20th-century Egyptian people